α-Santalol, also referred to as alpha-santalol,  is an organic compound that is classified as a sesquiterpene.  It comprises about 55% of the oil of sandalwood, another less abundant component being β-santalol.  As of 2002, about 60 tons of sandalwood oil are produced annually by steam distillation of the heartwood of Santalum album.  It is a valued component for perfumes.

Because of concerns about the sustainability of sandalwood tree cultivation, scientists have developed routes to α-santalol and β-santalol via fermentation, including using Rhodobacter sphaeroides. BASF launched its version, Isiobionic Santalol, in July 2020.

The oil content varies greatly within the different sandalwood species. This level is typically highest in S. album, S. paniculatum and S. yasi. The scent profile also changes considerably between the different species' oils.

References

Perfume ingredients
Primary alcohols
Sesquiterpenes
Cyclopropanes

ru:Санталол